Richard or Dickie Fuller may refer to:

Richard Fuller (politician, died 1782), MP for Steyning 1764–68, Stockbridge 1768–74
 Richard Fuller (Conservative politician) (born 1962), British Conservative Member of Parliament for Bedford from 2010 to 2017 and North East Bedfordshire from 2019
 Richard Fuller (footballer) (1913–1983), English footballer
 Richard Fuller (environmentalist) (born 1960), founder, Blacksmith Institute
 Richard Fuller (pianist) (born 1947), American classical pianist
 Richard Fuller (minister) (1804–1876), founder of the Southern Baptist movement
 Richard Buckminster Fuller, American engineer, author and designer
 Richard Fuller, founder of the Seattle Art Museum

See also
 Dickie Fuller (1913–1987), West Indian cricketer